Chilean ship Presidente Pinto may refer to:
 
  or Presidente Pinto